The San Antonio Black Bronchos were a Negro league baseball team, based in San Antonio, Texas, that played from 1907 to 1909. Smokey Joe Williams played for the team.

References

1907 establishments in Texas
1909 disestablishments in Texas
African-American history in San Antonio
African-American history of Texas
Baseball teams established in 1908
Baseball teams disestablished in 1909
Negro league baseball teams
Defunct baseball teams in Texas